The 2009 Manly Warringah Sea Eagles season was the 60th in the club's history. They competed in the National Rugby League's 2009 Telstra Premiership and finished the regular season the 5th (out of 16). The Sea Eagles were then knocked out in the first week of the play-offs by eventual premiers, the Melbourne Storm.

Season summary
As 2008 NRL premiers, the Manly Warringah Sea Eagles started their new season with the 2009 World Club Challenge match in England against Super League's 2008 champions, the Leeds Rhinos. They defeated the Rhinos 28 - 20, putting an end to England club football's 5-year hold on the World Club Challenge trophy before preparing for the start of the 2009 NRL season.

Sea Eagles star player Brett Stewart was accused of a sexual assault with a 17-year-old girl, this coming the same day after Manly's infamous season launch on 6 March, where it was believed Stewart got drunk. The NRL suspended Stewart until Round 5 of the competition, but he was still allowed to train with the club. As a result, the club started their premiership defence poorly, with four consecutive losses seeing them at last place after round four. They won their fifth round match so they were the last team to record their first win of the season, against the Wests Tigers. Upon Stewart's return he scored 3 tries in the Sea Eagles' first win of the season. Stewart was exonerated over his sexual assault charge in September 2010.

Stewart only played four further matches in the 2009 season; he suffered a knee injury in the Sea Eagles' round six victory over the South Sydney Rabbitohs and missed a great deal of football. He returned in round 25, just in time for Manly's charge to the finals; after the Sea eagles initially struggled without him on the field. Manly were eliminated in the first round of finals, going down 40-12 to the Melbourne Storm at Etihad Stadium despite finishing fifth at the end of the regular season. Losses to two of the top three teams were the reasons for Manly's early exit, ending their premiership defence in disappointment.

2009 Squad

Table

References

Manly Warringah Sea Eagles seasons
Manly Warringah Sea Eagles season